Christmas is an album by Kirk Franklin & the Family. Serving as their first and currently their only Christmas album.

Synopsis
Christmas is the second album by Franklin and is also the second album released by Franklin in collaboration with The Family Choir.

Track listing

Certifications 

References

1995 Christmas albums
Christmas albums by American artists
Kirk Franklin albums
Gospel Christmas albums